The Imaginary Voyage (French: Le voyage imaginaire) is a 1926 French silent comedy film directed by René Clair and starring Dolly Davis, Jean Börlin and Albert Préjean.

Cast
 Dolly Davis as Lucie - une dactylo  
 Jean Börlin as Jean  
 Albert Préjean as Albert  
 Jim Gérald as Auguste  
 Paul Ollivier as Le directeur de la banque  
 Maurice Schutz as La sorcière  
 Yvonne Legeay as La mauvaise fée  
 Marguerite Madys as Urgel - la bonne fée 
 Marise Maia
 Bronja Perlmutter
 Jane Pierson 
 Louis Pré Fils

References

Bibliography 
 Dayna Oscherwitz & MaryEllen Higgins. The A to Z of French Cinema. Scarecrow Press, 2009.

External links 
 

1926 films
French silent feature films
1920s French-language films
Films directed by René Clair
French black-and-white films
French comedy films
1926 comedy films
Silent comedy films
1920s French films